Shields Road railway station was a railway station in Pollokshields, Glasgow, Scotland. Opened in 1870, it was expanded in 1925 when the adjacent Pollokshields and Shields stations were amalgamated into it. It closed in 1966.

History
The station was built by the City of Glasgow Union Railway on the original 1840 line from Paisley to Glasgow.

Contemporary maps show that there were no stations at Shields Junction, prior to the general reorganisation of rail links between Paisley and Glasgow in the 1870s, in preparation for the opening of the new city centre terminals.

From 1885, however, after Shields station opened, there were three adjacent stations at this site, each with their own booking offices fronting Shields Road. Shields Road station was the largest of the three, sharing one of its platforms with Pollokshields station, which had been squeezed into the northern part of the complex, on the new track which had been laid to establish a link between Paisley and the Caledonian Railway’s proposed Glasgow Central station.

The three stations at Shields Junction were amalgamated in 1925, creating a larger Shields Road station, which was in use until 1966, when train services to St Enoch ended.

References

Notes

Sources

External links 
Photographs and historical maps of Shields Junction, Glasgow, before and after the building of the stations

Disused railway stations in Glasgow
Railway stations in Great Britain opened in 1870
Railway stations in Great Britain closed in 1917
Railway stations in Great Britain opened in 1925
Railway stations in Great Britain closed in 1966
Beeching closures in Scotland
Former Glasgow and South Western Railway stations
Pollokshields